The jardin des plantes de Caen (French for: 'Garden of the Plants of Caen'), also known as jardin botanique de Caen ('Botanical Garden of Caen') is a botanical garden and arboretum located at 5, place Blot, Caen, Calvados, Normandy, France. Covering 5,000 m², it is open daily.

The garden's earliest plants were collected in 1689, and its first catalog published in 1781 (Jardin botanique de Caen by Farin and Demoneuse). It was established on the site of an old stone quarry as a university botanical garden, but in 1803, after the French Revolution, it was extended by 3.5 hectares to become a municipal park. In 1860 two large greenhouses were constructed, and a botanical institute added in 1891, but all were destroyed in World War II. New greenhouses were built in 1988.

Today the garden contains more than 8,000 species laid out in two sections. The lower section contains native plants of Normandy (about 1,000 species), a medicinal garden (600 plants), horticultural collections (700 varieties), rockeries (1,500 dwarf specimens), an arboretum of trees and shrubs (500 species), and a greenhouse of about 1,500 exotic species. The upper section is a public park containing remarkable tree specimens including Sophora japonica (1750),  Sequoiadendron giganteum (1890), and Cryptomeria japonica (1870).

The garden also has a pedagogical role, where gardeners can ask advice to professionals, who are available to answer questions and regularly organize workshops, and is committed on environmental issues. During Spring, they offer ladybug and lacewing eggs to local gardeners, in order to encourage biological gardening and avoiding the use of pesticides,.

See also 

 List of botanical gardens in France

References 
 Jardin des plantes de Caen (the garden's page within the municipality official website)
 Conservatoire des Jardins et Paysages description (French)
 Au Jardin description and photographs (French)
 Brittany Ferries description
 Jardins et Loisirs description (French)
 Roger Lawrence Williams, Botanophilia in Eighteenth-century France: The Spirit of the Enlightenment, Springer, 2001, page 117. .

Specific

Caen, Jardin des plantes de
Caen, Jardin des plantes de